Ghazaouet is a town and commune in Tlemcen Province in northwestern Algeria. According to the 2008 census it has a population of 33774. It is renowned for its fresh fish. The well known Algerian comedian Abdelkader Secteur is also from this town. It was formerly known as Nemours.

Majority of Fliti's are also from this region.

See also

List of lighthouses in Algeria

References

Communes of Tlemcen Province
Lighthouses in Algeria
Tlemcen Province